In abstract algebra, in semigroup theory, a Schutzenberger group is a certain group associated with a Green H-class of a semigroup. The Schutzenberger groups associated with different H-classes are different. However, the groups associated with two different H-classes contained in the same D-class of a semigroup are isomorphic. Moreover, if the H-class  itself were a group, the Schutzenberger group of the H-class would be isomorphic to the H-class. In fact, there are two Schutzenberger groups associated with a given H-class and each is antiisomorphic to the other.

The Schutzenberger group was discovered by Marcel-Paul Schützenberger in 1957 and the terminology was coined by A. H. Clifford.

The Schutzenberger group
Let S be a semigroup and let S1 be the semigroup obtained by adjoining an identity element  1 to S (if S already has an identity element, then S1 = S). Green's H-relation  in S is defined as follows: If a and b are in S then

a H b  ⇔ there are u, v, x, y in S1  such that ua = ax = b and vb = by = a.

For a in S, the set of all b 's in S such that a H b is the Green  H-class of S containing a, denoted by Ha.

Let H be an H-class of the semigroup S.  Let T(H) be the set of all elements t in S1 such that Ht is a subset of H itself. Each t in T(H) defines a transformation, denoted by γt, of H by mapping h in H to ht in H.  The set of all these transformations of H, denoted by Γ(H), is a group under composition of mappings (taking functions as right operators). The group Γ(H) is the Schutzenberger group associated with the H-class H.

Examples 

If H is a maximal subgroup of a monoid M (a semigroup with identity), then H is an H-class, and it is naturally isomorphic to its own Schutzenberger group.

In general, one has that the cardinality of H and its Schutzenberger group coincide for any H-class H.

Applications 

It is known that a monoid with finitely many left and right ideals is finitely presented (or just finitely generated) if and only if all of its Schutzenberger groups are finitely presented (respectively, finitely generated).  Similarly such a monoid is residually finite if and only if all of its Schutzenberger groups are residually finite.

References

Semigroup theory